Start-up Nation: The Story of Israel's Economic Miracle is a 2009 book by Dan Senor and Saul Singer about the economy of Israel. It examines how Israel, a 60-year-old nation with a population of 7.1 million, was able to reach such economic growth that "at the start of 2009, some 63 Israeli companies were listed on the NASDAQ, more than those of any other foreign country."

In 2010, Start-up Nation was ranked fifth on the business bestseller list of The New York Times. It also reached The Wall Street Journal bestseller list.

Book overview
The Council on Foreign Relations states in its publisher's blurb for the book that Start-up Nation addresses the question: "How is it that Israel—a country of 7.1 million people, only sixty years old, surrounded by enemies, in a constant state of war since its founding, with no natural resources—produces more start-up companies on a per capita basis than large, peaceful, and stable nations and regions like Japan, China, India, Korea, Canada, and all of Europe?" The Economist notes that Israel now has more high-tech start-ups and a larger venture capital industry per capita than any other country in the world. The success of Israel's high-tech sector over the past two decades has attracted recent attention from business journalists and The Economist describes Start-up Nation as the most notable of a "growing pile" of books on the subject.

In their attempt to explain Israel's success in this area, Senor and Singer discard "the argument from ethnic or religious exceptionalism, dismissing 'unitary Jewishness' or even individual talent as major reasons for Israel's high-tech success" and analyze two major factors that, in the authors' opinion, contribute most to Israel's economic growth. Those factors are mandatory military service and immigration.

The authors argue that a major factor for Israel's economic growth can be found in the culture of the Israel Defense Forces, in which service is mandatory for most young Israelis. The authors believe that IDF service provides potential entrepreneurs with the opportunities to develop a wide array of skills and contacts. They also believe that IDF service provides experience exerting responsibility in a relatively un-hierarchical environment where creativity and intelligence are highly valued. IDF soldiers "have minimal guidance from the top, and are expected to improvise, even if this means breaking some rules. If you're a junior officer, you call your higher-ups by their first names, and if you see them doing something wrong, you say so." Neither ranks nor ages matter much "when taxi drivers can command millionaires and 23-year-olds can train their uncles," and "Israeli forces regularly vote to oust their unit leaders."

The book also dwells at length on immigration and its role in Israel's economic growth: "Immigrants are not averse to start from scratch. They are by definition risk-takers. A nation of immigrants is a nation of entrepreneurs. From survivors of the Holocaust to Soviet refuseniks through the Ethiopian Jews, the State of Israel never ceased to be a land of immigration: 9 out of 10 Jewish Israelis today are immigrants or descendants of immigrants the first or second generation. This specific demographic, causing fragmentation of community that still continues in the country, is nevertheless a great incentive to try their luck, to take risks because immigrants have nothing to lose."

Additional factors cited by the authors include a sense of dissatisfaction with the current state of affairs, a culture where individuals frequently tinker with technology, and government policies friendly to start-ups.

Using stories and anecdotes, the book provides examples of Israel's technological and medical achievements, among them "the Israeli innovations that made possible Google Suggest, the list of suggestions that appear instantly in menu form as you type a search request, the capsule endoscopy, a miniature camera embedded in a pill so that 18 photos per second can be wirelessly and painlessly transmitted from gastrointestinal tracts."

While the book describes Israel's many successes in technological innovation, it also attempts to address, in the words of one reviewer, why Israel still lacks its own Nokia, Samsung, or IBM. According to the book's authors, this is partly because Israeli startups tend to be bought up by large foreign companies and partly because Israeli business has thus far failed to develop the kind of mature management culture needed to run such companies.

Senor and Singer interviewed over 100 people to write the book, among them leading Israeli venture investors including key players in Google, Intel, and Cisco; and historians, U.S. military leaders, and Israeli heads of state. Their conclusion is that "while Israel has much to learn from the world, the world has much to learn from Israel."

Authors

Dan Senor is a former foreign policy official in the United States government. He served as chief spokesmen for the Coalition Provisional Authority in Iraq and now advises venture capital firms. Saul Singer is a columnist and former editorial page editor for The Jerusalem Post.

Critical reception

Praise
Jon Rosen OF USA Today believes that the book is written from an Israeli perspective and may irk those with reservations about Israeli foreign policy, but it is still an accomplishment, "not simply for exposing the roots of Israel's success, but by showing what the Israeli case might teach the rest of the world." In The Wall Street Journal, James K. Glassman says that "the greatest strength of Start-up Nation is not analysis but anecdote. The authors tell vivid stories of entrepreneurial success, such as that of Shai Agassi, the son of an Iraqi immigrant to Israel, with his electric-automobile technology, now in the process of creating 'Car 2.0.'"

Publishers Weekly states that "the authors ground their analysis in case studies and interviews with some of Israel's most brilliant innovators to make this a rich and insightful read not just for business leaders and policy makers but for anyone curious about contemporary Israeli culture."

In The Economic Times, R Gopalakrishnan writes that the use of Hebrew expressions makes the book "alive and eminently-readable." Besides chutzpah, the authors use the word bitzua, which roughly means "getting things done." Another Hebrew expression used in the book is rosh gadol, literally "big head", which could be translated "can-do and responsible attitude with scant respect for the limitations of formal authority." Gopalakrishnan concludes that the ideas demonstrated in the book "are highly relevant for innovation capability in general, but for India, especially at this juncture."

David Horovitz of The Jerusalem Post says that conclusions of Start-up Nation find confirmation in the real world, such as how the life of Congresswoman Gabby Giffords was saved when an emergency medical team applied a revolutionary elasticized bandage developed in Israel to staunch her head wounds.

A review in The Washington Post says that "the book weaves together colorful stories of Israeli technological triumphs" such as the story of Shvat Shaked, who "founded a cybersecurity firm with his old buddy from Army intelligence and had the chutzpah to bet a top executive at PayPal, the online commerce company owned by eBay, that his few dozen engineers could beat PayPal's thousands in developing secure online software." The review also states that the authors could have done a better job drawing "straight lines between their theories about Israel's success and these case studies".

Maureen Farrell of Forbes was disappointed that the authors mostly ignored the effects of U.S. foreign aid [.8% of its economic output].  She says the book "is worth reading to understand not just Israel's history but the history of capitalism and innovation."

Criticism
Ruth Schuster, reviewing the book for Haaretz, feels that it is "tarnished by a jarring, tub-thumping patriotism." A review in The Christian Science Monitor notes that "critics say that the story behind how a country of 7 million has more Nasdaq-listed companies than Europe is more complex than Singer and Senor paint it to be."

Yusuf Mansur, writing in The Jordan Times, argues that two of the factors to which Senor and Singer attribute Israel's success, the IDF and Soviet-Jewish immigration, have only been sustainable because of the foreign aid that Israel receives from the United States and private sources. Mansur also faults the authors for suggesting that the disparity between entrepreneurship in Israel's Arab and Jewish sectors is rooted in the exemption of Arabs from military service rather than what Mansour perceives to be "the discriminatory policies of Israel against its Arab citizens," particularly in education and the labor market.

Gal Beckerman, writing in The Forward magazine, observes that the book "presents Israel in an extremely positive light as a bastion of entrepreneurial spirit and technological achievement. It skirts a discussion of the conflict with the Palestinians, or even the wealth inequality within Israel, thereby dovetailing nicely with recent public relations efforts by Israel to shift attention away from its problems and toward its achievements."

Impact
Journalists and policymakers in several countries have recommended Start-up Nation as a useful guide for promoting entrepreneurship. A review of the book in The Irish Times calls on Ireland to follow Israel's model. Andrius Kubilius, the prime minister of Lithuania, has cited Start-up Nation as his favorite book. Yrjö Ojasaar, managing partner of Solon Partners, an executive consulting and angel investor company in Estonia, says "there is much to be learned from the Israeli experience of venture capital incubation through building incentives for privatization." CNN's Fareed Zakaria called Start-up Nation "a book every single Arab businessman, Arab bureaucrat, and Arab politician should read." The book is cited as a handbook of "classic economics." It teaches small businesses "how effective a cohesive team can be, especially when that team places an emphasis on chutzpah first."

Former Palestinian Prime Minister Salam Fayyad reportedly kept a copy of Start-up Nation on his desk as a source of inspiration for the West Bank's own burgeoning technology industry.

See also
Economy of Israel
Israeli inventions and discoveries
Science and technology in Israel
Silicon Wadi, the areas with a high concentration of high-technology companies in Israel
List of Israeli companies quoted on the Nasdaq
List of multinationals with research and development centres in Israel
Venture capital in Israel

References

External links
 Start-Up Nation Central, "an independent non-profit that builds bridges for Israeli innovation"

2009 non-fiction books
Business books
Books about Israel
Economy of Israel
Twelve (publisher) books